The 1912 United States presidential election in North Carolina took place on November 5, 1912, as part of the 1912 United States presidential election. North Carolina voters chose 12 representatives, or electors, to the Electoral College, who voted for president and vice president.

North Carolina was won by Princeton University President Woodrow Wilson (D–Virginia), running with governor of Indiana Thomas R. Marshall, with 59.24% of the popular vote, against the 26th president of the United States Theodore Roosevelt (P–New York), running with governor of California Hiram Johnson, with 28.34% of the popular vote and the 27th president of the United States William Howard Taft (R–Ohio), running with Columbia University President Nicholas Murray Butler, with 11.95% of the popular vote. , this is the last election in which Wilkes County, Avery County, and Mitchell County did not support the Republican candidate.

Results

Results by county

Notes

References

North Carolina
1912
1912 North Carolina elections